Brushy Creek is a stream in Morgan County in the U.S. state of Missouri. It is a tributary of Gravois Creek.

The confluence is adjacent to Missouri Route 5 approximately 2.5 miles northwest of the community of Gravois Mills.

Brushy Creek was so named due to the prevalence of brush along its streambanks.

See also
List of rivers of Missouri

References

Rivers of Morgan County, Missouri
Rivers of Missouri